Jersey is the most populated of the crown dependencies and of the Channel Islands. The Demographic statistics of the island includes population density, ethnicity, education level, health of the populace, economic status, religious affiliations and other aspects of the population.

The population of Jersey has grown in each census record since 1931 (although those did not include records during the Occupation by Nazi Germany).

History
The resident population of Jersey has been increasing during the last 60 years. The resident population increased by 9,100 between 2010 and 2011. The estimated 2020 growth rate is 0.72%.

Pre-census data, there are a number of estimates for Jersey's population. It was around 2,000 in 4000-3000 BC; 6,000 in 1050; 10,000 in 1331; and between 10,000 and 20,000 in the 16th and 17th centuries.

From the 16th to 19th centuries, Jersey was home to a number of French religious refugees, possibly up to 4,000 at a time. In the first half of the 19th century, tax advantages and a better climate saw a boom in Jersey's population. This also needed a large immigrant population, with significant movement from Scotland and Ireland.

Before 1851 and 1921, Jersey's population fell significantly, but the number of French people rose by more than 3,000. These were mostly agricultural workers (not replacing the British migrants).

From 1821, Jersey conducted an annual census (figures to the right). In 1951, the population was 55,244. It has grown every decade since then, and the rate of growth now is very high (1% per year in 2019). This is due to the growth of the finance industry and tourism.

Population
In 2021, the total resident population of Jersey is 103,267, although the CIA World Factbook estimates it as 101,073 (this may be due to a different estimate).

Geographic distribution 
Jersey is divided into twelve parishes. The most populous parish is St Helier, with 35% of the island's population. In 1798, around 6,000 people lived in St. Helier, or one-fifth of the island's population at the time.

Age structure 

In 2011, there were 64,353 people of working age (16 to 64 for men, and 16 to 59 for women; 66% of the population). The dependency ratio for Jersey was 52% (similar to 2011); the dependency ratio is around the same value as that in 1931, however was higher (60%) in 1971, and lower (47%) in 1991.

Place of birth 
Half of the population of Jersey was born on the island, with the majority of the remainder from elsewhere in the British Islands. 7% of the population was born in Portugal, conspicuously from Madeira Autonomous Region, a sister province, the largest overseas place of birth. In 1981, only 3% of the population was born in Portugal and 5% elsewhere.

Of the category 'Other European country', the primary countries were France and Romania and for 'Elsewhere in the world', the primary countries were South Africa and India.

Statistics 
The following demographic statistics are from the CIA World Factbook, unless otherwise indicated.

Birth rate
11.0 births/1,000 population (2005)

Death rate
8.5 deaths/1,000 population (2005)

Net immigration rate
2.81 migrant(s)/1,000 population (2000 est.)

Sex ratio

Infant mortality
4 deaths/1,000 live births (2005)

Life expectancy at birth
total population:
78.48 years
male:
76.07 years
female:
81.07 years (2000 est.)

Average age at death
 Men 72
 Women 79

Total fertility rate
1.56 children born/woman (2000 est.)

Nationality
noun:
Jerseyman, Jerseywoman, Jèrriais, Jèrriaise
adjective:
Jersey

Ethnic groups
Indigenous Jersey-Normans and those of British and French descent. Portuguese, Polish, Irish and Romanian minorities.

Religions
Anglican, Roman Catholic, Baptist, Methodist and Presbyterian.

Languages
See Languages of Jersey
English (official), French (official), Jèrriais (official: though only spoken by a few native elderly in rural areas, used as a first language by around 1,900 people).
Portuguese commonly spoken by migrant workers and is sometimes found in written form, e.g. government informational signs.

Literacy
82% of children in state schools achieve their reading targets – the UK average is 90%. This leads to some cases of illiteracy in Jersey.

See also
 List of people from Jersey

References

 
Society of Jersey

pl:Jersey#Demografia